This page provides supplementary chemical data on acetaldehyde.

Material Safety Data Sheet  

The handling of this chemical may require safety precautions. The directions on the Material Safety Datasheet (MSDS) should be followed.
SDSdata.org index

Structure and properties

Thermodynamic properties

Vapor pressure of liquid

Table data obtained from CRC Handbook of Chemistry and Physics 44th ed.

Spectral data

References

Chemical data pages
Chemical data pages cleanup